Hanusch is a German language surname, written Hanuš in Czech. Notable people with the surname include:

Ferdinand Hanusch (1866–1923), Austrian politician
Steve Hanusch (born 1990), German ice hockey player
Andressa Hanusch (born 1987), brazilian businesswoman.

See also
 Hanuš (disambiguation)

German-language surnames